The Suriname President's Cup is an association football super cup competition organized by the Surinamese Football Association. The match puts the winners of the SVB Eerste Divisie and the SVB Cup against each other.

History

The tournament began in the 1993 season. The first champion was PVV. In 2018, SV Robinhood won the trophy for the seventh time, becoming the most successful club in the competition's history. Inter Moengotapoe matched the record in 2019.

Past finals

Number of titles

References

External links
Surinam - List of (Super) Cup Winners, RSSSF.com

 
President's Cup
Suriname